The NES Satellite is a Nintendo Entertainment System multiplayer adaptor accessory (multitap), created by Nintendo and released in 1989 as a part of the NES Sports Set.

With select supporting games, the Satellite allows up to four players to play the NES, potentially simultaneously. Additionally, it acts as a wireless range extender adaptor for all wired controllers, with the use of portable, battery-powered, infrared technology. While a normal controller has a range of 7.6 feet, the NES Satellite expands the usable range to 15 feet. A small infrared receiver plugs into the two controller ports on the front of the NES.  The main Satellite unit is powered by six C-cell batteries and must have a line of sight to the receiver.  The unit has four controller ports which accommodate any type of wired NES controllers.  The unit provides "Turbo" selectors for both the A and B buttons.

A similar four-player adaptor called the NES Four Score was released a year later, although it does not allow wireless play.

Games
These licensed games are compatible with the NES Satellite's four-player abilities.

Bomberman II
Championship Bowling
Danny Sullivan's Indy Heat
Gauntlet II
Greg Norman's Golf Power
Harlem Globetrotters
Kings of the Beach
Magic Johnson's Fast Break
Monster Truck Rally
M.U.L.E.
NES Play Action Football
A Nightmare on Elm Street
Nintendo World Cup
R.C. Pro-Am II
Rackets & Rivals
Rock 'n Ball
Roundball: 2 on 2 Challenge
Spot
Smash TV
Super Off Road
Super Jeopardy!
Super Spike V'Ball
Swords and Serpents
Top Players' Tennis

These homebrew games are also compatible.

Justice Duel
Micro Mages

Notes

See also
Famicom Four-way Adapter
NES Four Score
Multitap
List of Nintendo Entertainment System accessories

References

Nintendo Entertainment System accessories
Computer-related introductions in 1989